Baygamut is a rural locality (a settlement) in Orleansky Selsoviet, Blagoveshchensky District, Altai Krai, Russia. The population was 86 as of 2013. It was founded in 1820. There are 3 streets.

Geography 
Baygamut is located 40 km southwest of Blagoveshchenka (the district's administrative centre) by road. Orlean is the nearest rural locality.

References 

Rural localities in Blagoveshchensky District, Altai Krai